Camila Jersonsky (born ) is an Argentine female volleyball player. She was part of the Argentina women's national volleyball team at the Pan-American Volleyball Cup (in 2009 and 2011) and the FIVB Volleyball World Grand Prix (in 2011 and 2012).

At club level she played for Institución cultural y deportiva Pedro Echagüe, Club Atlético y Biblioteca Bell and Auburn University.

Clubs
  Pedro Echagüe
  Bell Vóley (2009–2010)
  Auburn Tigers (2010–2013)

References

External links
 Profile at FIVB.org
 Profile at Auburn Tigers
 http://www.auburntigers.com/sports/w-volley/spec-rel/081716aab.html

1991 births
Living people
Argentine women's volleyball players
Volleyball players from Buenos Aires
Middle blockers
21st-century Argentine women